Alysos, also known as Altsos (‪Άλτσος) or Alsos (Άλσος‬), is a rock in the Meteora rock formation complex of Thessaly, Greece. The rock overlooks the eastern side of the town of Kalabaka.

Monastery of the Apostle Peter's Chains
The Monastery of the Apostle Peter's Chains (Alyseos Apostolou Petrou, Αλύσεως Αποστόλου Πέτρου) on Alysos Rock was probably built around 1400. The ruins can still be found on the rock today. In full, the monastery is known as the Monastery of the Veneration of the Chains of the Apostle Peter.

References

Rocks of Meteora
Former Christian monasteries in Greece